Lauchlan is both a surname and a given name. Notable people with the name include:

Surname
Agnes Lauchlan (1905–1993), British stage, film and television actress
Bill Lauchlan (1916–2009), Scottish communist activist
Doug Lauchlan, Canadian politician, minister and educator
Grant Lauchlan, Scottish entertainment journalist, producer and film reporter for STV in Scotland
Jim Lauchlan (born 1977), Scottish footballer
Martin Lauchlan (born 1980), Scottish former professional footballer

Given name
Lauchlan Maclean, 2nd Laird of Brolas (1650–1687), the second Laird of Brolas
Lauchlan Dalgleish (born 1993), former professional Australian rules footballer
John Lauchlan Farris, Q.C., (1911–1986), Canadian lawyer and judge
Lauchlan Bellingham Mackinnon (1815–1877), Member of Parliament for Rye, Sussex, England, 1865–1868
Lauchlan Mackinnon (1817–1888), pastoralist, politician and newspaper proprietor in colonial Australia
Lauchlan McGillivray (died 1880), 19th-century Member of Parliament from Southland, New Zealand
Lauchlan Watt (1867–1957), the minister of Glasgow Cathedral from 1923 to 1934

See also
Lachlan (disambiguation)
McLauchlan